= Solridge =

- Location within Gauteng Location within South Africa
- Coordinates: 26.078°S 28.021°E
- Country: South Africa
- Province: Gauteng
- Municipality: City of Johannesburg

Area
  - Total: 0.24 km^{2} (0.093 sq mi)

Population (2001)
  - Total: 372
  - Density: 1,500/km^{2} (4,000/sq mi)

Racial makeup (2001)
  - Black African: 35.5%
  - Coloured: 4.8%
  - White: 58.9%

First languages (2001)
  - English: 68.6%
  - Zulu: 8.1%
  - Sotho: 6.45%
  - Xhosa: 5.7%
  - Tswana: 4.0%
- Time zone: UTC+2 (SAST)
- Postal code (street): 2191
- PO box: 2060

Solridge is a suburb of Johannesburg, South Africa. It is located in Region B of the City of Johannesburg Metropolitan Municipality.
